The grey-throated leaftosser (Sclerurus albigularis) is a species of bird in the family Furnariidae. It is found in Bolivia, Brazil, Colombia, Costa Rica, Ecuador, Panama, Peru, Trinidad and Tobago, and Venezuela. Its natural habitats are subtropical or tropical moist lowland forest and subtropical or tropical moist montane forest.

References

grey-throated leaftosser
Birds of Costa Rica
Birds of the Northern Andes
Birds of Trinidad and Tobago
grey-throated leaftosser
grey-throated leaftosser
grey-throated leaftosser
Taxonomy articles created by Polbot